Metrobates hesperius is a species of water strider in the family Gerridae. It is found in the Caribbean Sea and North America.

Subspecies
These three subspecies belong to the species Metrobates hesperius:
 Metrobates hesperius depilatus Hussey & Herring, 1949
 Metrobates hesperius hesperius Uhler, 1871
 Metrobates hesperius ocalensis Hussey & Herring, 1949

References

Trepobatinae
Articles created by Qbugbot
Insects described in 1871